Henri-Louis Bergson (18 October 1859 – 4 January 1941) was a French philosopher who was influential in the tradition of analytic philosophy and continental philosophy, especially during the first half of the 20th century until the Second World War, but also after 1966 when Gilles Deleuze published Le Bergsonisme. Bergson is known for his arguments that processes of immediate experience and intuition are more significant than abstract rationalism and science for understanding reality.

He was awarded the 1927 Nobel Prize in Literature "in recognition of his rich and vitalizing ideas and the brilliant skill with which they have been presented". In 1930, France awarded him its highest honour, the Grand-Croix de la Legion d'honneur. Bergson's great popularity created a controversy in France where his views were seen as opposing the secular and scientific attitude adopted by the Republic's officials.

Biography

Overview 

Bergson lived the quiet life of a French professor, marked by the publication of his four principal works:

 in 1889, Time and Free Will (Essai sur les données immédiates de la conscience)
 in 1896, Matter and Memory (Matière et mémoire)
 in 1907, Creative Evolution (L'Évolution créatrice)
 in 1932, The Two Sources of Morality and Religion (Les deux sources de la morale et de la religion)

In 1900 the Collège de France selected Bergson to a Chair of Greek and Roman Philosophy, which he held until 1904. He then replaced Gabriel Tarde in the Chair of Modern Philosophy, which he held until 1920. The public attended his open courses in large numbers.

Early years 
Bergson was born in the Rue Lamartine in Paris, not far from the Palais Garnier (the old Paris opera house) in 1859. His father, the composer and pianist Michał Bergson, was of Polish-Jewish background (originally bearing the name Bereksohn). His great-grandmother, Temerl Bergson, was a well-known patroness and benefactor of Polish Jewry, especially those associated with the Hasidic movement. His mother, Katherine Levison, daughter of a Yorkshire doctor, was from an English-Jewish and Irish-Jewish background. The Bereksohns were a famous Jewish entrepreneurial family of Polish descent. Henri Bergson's great-great-grandfather, was a prominent banker and a protégé of Stanisław II Augustus,
King of Poland from 1764 to 1795.

Henri Bergson's family lived in London for a few years after his birth, and he obtained an early familiarity with the English language from his mother. Before he was nine, his parents settled in France, Henri becoming a naturalized French citizen.

Henri Bergson married Louise Neuberger, a cousin of Marcel Proust, in 1891. (The novelist served as best man at Bergson's wedding.) Henri and Louise Bergson had a daughter, Jeanne, born deaf in 1896. Bergson's sister, Mina Bergson (also known as Moina Mathers), married the English occult author Samuel Liddell MacGregor Mathers, a founder of the Hermetic Order of the Golden Dawn, and the couple later relocated to Paris as well.

Education and career

Bergson attended the Lycée Fontanes (known as the Lycée Condorcet 1870–1874 and 1883–present) in Paris from 1868 to 1878. He had previously received a Jewish religious education. Between 14 and 16, however, he lost his faith. According to Hude (1990), this moral crisis is tied to his discovery of the theory of evolution, according to which humanity shares common ancestry with modern primates, a process sometimes construed as not needing a creative deity.

While at the lycée, Bergson won a prize for his scientific work and another, in 1877 when he was eighteen, for the solution of a mathematical problem. His solution was published the following year in Nouvelles Annales de Mathématiques. It was his first published work. After some hesitation as to whether his career should lie in the sphere of the sciences or that of the humanities, he decided in favour of the latter, to the dismay of his teachers. When he was nineteen, he entered the École Normale Supérieure. During this period, he read Herbert Spencer. He obtained there the degree of licence ès lettres, and this was followed by that of agrégation de philosophie in 1881 from the University of Paris.

The same year he received a teaching appointment at the lycée in Angers, the ancient capital of Anjou.

The year after his arrival at Clermont-Ferrand, Bergson displayed his ability in the humanities by the publication of an edition of extracts from Lucretius, with a critical study of De Rerum Natura, issued as Extraits de Lucrèce, and of the materialist cosmology of the poet (1884), repeated editions of which attest to its value in promoting Classics among French youth. While teaching and lecturing in this part of his country (the Auvergne region), Bergson found time for private study and original work. He crafted his dissertation Time and Free Will, which was submitted, along with a short Latin thesis on Aristotle (Quid Aristoteles de loco senserit, "On the Concept of Place in Aristotle") for his doctoral degree, which was awarded by the University of Paris in 1889. The work was published in the same year by Félix Alcan. He also gave courses in Clermont-Ferrand on the Pre-Socratics, in particular on Heraclitus.

Lachelier endeavoured "to substitute everywhere force for inertia, life for death, and liberty for fatalism". (Bergson owed much to both of these teachers of the École Normale Supérieure. Compare his memorial address on Ravaisson, who died in 1900.) According to Louis de Broglie, Time and Free Will "antedates by forty years the ideas of Niels Bohr and Werner Heisenberg on the physical interpretation of wave mechanics."

Bergson settled again in Paris in 1888, and after teaching for some months at the municipal college, known as the College Rollin, he received an appointment at the Lycée Henri-Quatre, where he remained for eight years. There, he read Darwin, and gave a course on his theories. Although Bergson had previously endorsed Lamarckism and its theory of the heritability of acquired characteristics, he came to prefer Darwin's hypothesis of gradual variations, which were more compatible with his continual vision of life.

In 1896, he published his second major work, entitled Matter and Memory. This rather difficult work investigates the function of the brain and undertakes an analysis of perception and memory, leading up to a careful consideration of the problems of the relation of body and mind. Bergson had spent years of research in preparation for each of his three large works. This is especially obvious in Matter and Memory, where he showed a thorough acquaintance with the extensive pathological investigations which had been carried out during the period.

In 1898, Bergson became maître de conférences at his alma mater, École Normale Supérieure, and later in the same year received a promotion to a Professorship.

At the first International Congress of Philosophy, held in Paris during the first five days of August 1900, Bergson read a short, but important, paper, "Psychological Origins of the Belief in the Law of Causality" (Sur les origines psychologiques de notre croyance à la loi de causalité). In 1900, Felix Alcan published a work which had previously appeared in the Revue de Paris, entitled Laughter (Le rire), one of the most important of Bergson's minor productions. This essay on the meaning of comedy stemmed from a lecture which he had given in his early days in the Auvergne. The study of it is essential to an understanding of Bergson's views of life, and its passages dealing with the place of the artistic in life are valuable. The main thesis of the work is that laughter is a corrective evolved to make social life possible for human beings. We laugh at people who fail to adapt to the demands of society if it seems their failure is akin to an inflexible mechanism. Comic authors have exploited this human tendency to laugh in various ways, and what is common to them is the idea that the comic consists in there being "something mechanical encrusted on the living".

In 1901, the Académie des sciences morales et politiques elected Bergson as a member, and he became a member of the institute. In 1903 he contributed to the Revue de métaphysique et de morale a very important essay entitled Introduction to Metaphysics (Introduction à la metaphysique), which is useful as a preface to the study of his three large books. He detailed in this essay his philosophical program, realized in the Creative Evolution.

On the death of Gabriel Tarde, the sociologist and philosopher, in 1904, Bergson succeeded him in the Chair of Modern Philosophy. From 4 to 8 September of that year he visited Geneva, attending the Second International Congress of Philosophy, when he lectured on The Mind and Thought: A Philosophical Illusion (Le cerveau et la pensée: une illusion philosophique). An illness prevented his visiting Germany to attend the Third Congress held at Heidelberg. In these years, Bergson strongly influenced a young Jacques Maritain, perhaps even saving Maritain and his wife Raïssa from thoughts of suicide.

His third major work, Creative Evolution, the most widely known and most discussed of his books, appeared in 1907. Pierre Imbart de la Tour remarked that Creative Evolution was a milestone of new direction in thought. By 1918, Alcan, the publisher, had issued twenty-one editions, making an average of two editions per annum for ten years. Following the appearance of this book, Bergson's popularity increased enormously, not only in academic circles but among the general reading public.

At that time, Bergson had already made an extensive study of biology including the theory of fecundation (as shown in the first chapter of the Creative Evolution), which had only recently emerged, ca. 1885 – no small feat for a philosopher specializing in the history of philosophy, in particular Greek and Roman philosophy. He also most certainly had read, apart from Darwin, Haeckel, from whom he retained his idea of a unity of life and of the ecological solidarity between all living beings, as well as Hugo de Vries, from whom he quoted his mutation theory of evolution (which he opposed, preferring Darwin's gradualism). He also quoted Charles-Édouard Brown-Séquard, the successor of Claude Bernard at the Chair of Experimental Medicine in the Collège de France, etc.

Bergson served as a juror with Florence Meyer Blumenthal in awarding the Prix Blumenthal, a grant given between 1919 and 1954 to painters, sculptors, decorators, engravers, writers, and musicians.

Relationship with James and pragmatism
Bergson traveled to London in 1908 and met there with William James, the Harvard philosopher who was Bergson's senior by seventeen years, and who was instrumental in calling the attention of the Anglo-American public to the work of the French professor. The two became great friends. James's impression of Bergson is given in his Letters under date of 4 October 1908:

So modest and unpretending a man but such a genius intellectually! I have the strongest suspicions that the tendency which he has brought to a focus, will end by prevailing, and that the present epoch will be a sort of turning point in the history of philosophy.

As early as 1880, James had contributed an article in French to the periodical La Critique philosophique, of Renouvier and Pillon, entitled Le Sentiment de l'Effort. Four years later, a couple of articles by him appeared in the journal Mind: "What is an Emotion?" and "On some Omissions of Introspective Psychology". Bergson quoted the first two of these articles in his 1889 work, Time and Free Will. In the following years, 1890–91 appeared the two volumes of James's monumental work, The Principles of Psychology, in which he refers to a pathological phenomenon observed by Bergson. Some writers, taking merely these dates into consideration and overlooking the fact that James's investigations had been proceeding since 1870 (registered from time to time by various articles which culminated in "The Principles"), have mistakenly dated Bergson's ideas as earlier than James's.

William James hailed Bergson as an ally. In 1903, he wrote:
I have been re-reading Bergson's books, and nothing that I have read for years has so excited and stimulated my thoughts. I am sure that his philosophy has a great future; it breaks through old frameworks and brings things to a solution from which new crystallizations can be reached.

The most noteworthy tributes James paid to Bergson come in the Hibbert Lectures (A Pluralistic Universe), which James gave at Manchester College, Oxford, shortly after meeting Bergson in London. He remarks on the encouragement he gained from Bergson's thought, and refers to his confidence in being "able to lean on Bergson's authority." (See further James's reservations about Bergson, below.)

The influence of Bergson had led James "to renounce the intellectualist method and the current notion that logic is an adequate measure of what can or cannot be". It had induced him, he continued, "to give up logic, squarely and irrevocably" as a method, for he found that "reality, life, experience, concreteness, immediacy, use what word you will, exceeds our logic, overflows, and surrounds it".

These remarks, which appeared in James's book A Pluralistic Universe in 1909, impelled many English and American readers to investigate Bergson's philosophy for themselves, but no English translations of Bergson's major work had yet appeared. James, however, encouraged and assisted Arthur Mitchell in preparing an English translation of Creative Evolution. In August 1910, James died. It was his intention, had he lived to see the translation finished, to introduce it to the English reading public by a prefatory note of appreciation. In the following year, the translation was completed and still greater interest in Bergson and his work was the result. By coincidence, in that same year (1911), Bergson penned a preface of sixteen pages entitled Truth and Reality for the French translation of James's book, Pragmatism. In it, he expressed sympathetic appreciation of James's work, together with certain important reservations.

From 5 to 11 April, Bergson attended the Fourth International Congress of Philosophy held at Bologna, in Italy, where he gave an address on "Philosophical Intuition". In response to invitations he visited England in May of that year, and on several subsequent occasions. These visits were well received. His speeches offered new Perspectives and elucidated many passages in his three major works: Time and Free Will, Matter and Memory, and Creative Evolution. Although necessarily brief statements, they developed and enriched the ideas in his books and clarified for English audiences the fundamental principles of his philosophy.

Lectures on change
In May 1911, Bergson gave two lectures entitled The Perception of Change (La perception du changement) at the University of Oxford. The Clarendon Press published these in French in the same year.
His talks were concise and lucid, leading students and the general reader to his other, longer writings. Oxford later conferred on him the degree of Doctor of Science.

Two days later he delivered the Huxley Lecture at the University of Birmingham, taking for his subject Life and Consciousness. This subsequently appeared in The Hibbert Journal (October 1911), and since revised, is the first essay in the collected volume Mind-Energy (L'Énergie spirituelle). In October he again traveled to England, where he had an enthusiastic reception, and delivered at University College London four lectures on La Nature de l'Âme [The nature of the soul].

In 1913, Bergson visited the United States of America at the invitation of Columbia University, New York, and lectured in several American cities, where very large audiences welcomed him. In February, at Columbia University, he lectured both in French and English, taking as his subjects: Spirituality and Freedom and The Method of Philosophy. Being again in England in May of the same year, he accepted the Presidency of the British Society for Psychical Research, and delivered to the Society an address on Phantoms of Life and Psychic Research (Fantômes des vivants et recherche psychique).

Meanwhile, his popularity increased, and translations of his works began to appear in a number of languages: English, German, Italian, Danish, Swedish, Hungarian, Polish, and Russian. In 1914 Bergson's fellow-countrymen honoured him by his election as a member of the Académie française. He was also made President of the Académie des Sciences morales et politiques, and in addition, he became Officier de la Légion d'honneur, and Officier de l'Instruction publique.

Bergson found disciples of many types. In France movements such as neo-Catholicism and Modernism on the one hand and syndicalism on the other endeavoured to absorb and appropriate for their own ends some central ideas of his teaching. The continental organ of socialist and syndicalist theory, Le Mouvement socialiste, William James's students resisted the assimilation of his work to that of Bergson. See, for example, Horace Kallen's book on the subject James and Bergson. As Jean Wahl described the "ultimate disagreement" between James and Bergson in his System of Metaphysics: "for James, the consideration of action is necessary for the definition of truth, according to Bergson, action ... must be kept from our mind if we want to see the truth". Gide even went so far as to say that future historians will overestimate Bergson's influence on art and philosophy just because he was the self-appointed spokesman for "the spirit of the age".

As early as the 1890s, Santayana attacked certain key concepts in Bergson's philosophy, above all his view of the New and the indeterminate:

the possibility of a new and unaccountable fact appearing at any time," he writes in his book on Hermann Lotze, "does not practically affect the method of investigation; ... the only thing given up is the hope that these hypotheses may ever be adequate to the reality and cover the process of nature without leaving a remainder. This is no great renunciation; for that consummation of science ... is by no one really expected.

According to Santayana and Russell, Bergson projected false claims onto the aspirations of scientific method, claims which Bergson needed to make in order to justify his prior moral commitment to freedom. Russell takes particular exception to Bergson's understanding of number in chapter two of Time and Free-will. According to Russell, Bergson uses an outmoded spatial metaphor ("extended images") to describe the nature of mathematics as well as logic in general. "Bergson only succeeds in making his theory of number possible by confusing a particular collection with the number of its terms, and this again with number in general", writes Russell (see The Philosophy of Bergson and A History of Western Philosophy).

Suzanne Guerlac has argued that the more recent resurgence of scholarly interest in Bergson is related to the growing influence of his follower Deleuze within continental philosophy: "If there is a return to Bergson today, then, it is largely due to Gilles Deleuze whose own work has etched the contours of the New Bergson.  This is not only because Deleuze wrote about Bergson; it is also because Deleuze's own thought is deeply engaged with that of his predecessor, even when Bergson is not explicitly mentioned." Leonard Lawlor and Valentine Moulard agree with Guerlac that "the recent revitalization of Bergsonism ... is almost entirely due to Deleuze." They explain that Bergson's concept of multiplicity "is at the very heart of Deleuze's thought, and duration is the model for all of Deleuze's 'becomings.'  The other aspect that attracted Deleuze, which is indeed connected to the first, is Bergson's criticism of the concept of negation in Creative Evolution ... Thus Bergson became a resource in the criticism of the Hegelian dialectic, the negative." It is this aspect that Mark Sinclair focuses upon in Bergson (2020). He writes that despite the philosopher and his philosophy being very popular during the early years of the twentieth century, his ideas had been critiqued and then rejected first by phenomenology, then by existentialism, and finally by post-structuralism. As Sinclair goes on to explain, over series of publications including Bergsonism (1966) and Difference and Repetition (1968), Deleuze championed Bergson as a thinker of "difference that proceeds any sense of negation" In this way, "Deleuze’s interpretation served to keep the flame of Bergson’s philosophy alive and it has been a key motivation for the renewed scholarly attention to it."

Ilya Prigogine acknowledged Bergson's influence at his Nobel Prize reception lecture: "Since my adolescence, I have read many philosophical texts, and I still remember the spell L’évolution créatrice cast on me. More specifically, I felt that some essential message was embedded, still to be made explicit, in Bergson‘s remark: 'The more deeply we study the nature of time, the better we understand that duration means invention, creation of forms, continuous elaboration of the absolutely new.'"

Japanese philosopher Yasushi Hirai from Fukuoka University has led a collaborative and interdisciplinary project from 2007, bringing together Eastern and Western philosophers and scientists to discuss and promote Bergson's work. This has influenced the development of specific artificial neural networks which incorporate features inspired by Bergson's philosophy of memory.

In  The Matter with Things, Iain McGilchrist extensively cites Bergson.  "‘Bergson arrived’, according to philosopher Peter Gunter, ‘at insights closely resembling those of quantum physics.’ Only Bergson got there first."

Comparison to Indian philosophies
Several Hindu authors have found parallels to Hindu philosophy in Bergson's thought. The integrative evolutionism of Sri Aurobindo, an Indian philosopher from the early 20th century, has many similarities to Bergson's philosophy. Whether this represents a direct influence of Bergson is disputed, although Aurobindo was familiar with many Western philosophers. K Narayanaswami Aiyer, a member of the Theosophical Society, published a pamphlet titled "Professor Bergson and the Hindu Vedanta", where he argued that Bergson's ideas on matter, consciousness, and evolution were in agreement with Vedantic and Puranic explanations. Nalini Kanta Brahma, Marie Tudor Garland and Hope Fitz are other authors who have comparatively evaluated Hindu and Bergsonian philosophies, especially in relation to intuition, consciousness and evolution.

Bibliography
 Bergson, H.; The Philosophy of Poetry: The Genius of Lucretius (La Philosophie de la Poesie: le Génie de Lucrèce, 1884), Philosophical Library 1959: 
 Bergson, H.; Time and Free Will: An Essay on the Immediate Data of Consciousness (Essai sur les données immédiates de la conscience, 1889). Allen & Unwin 1910, Dover Publications 2001:  – Bergson's doctoral dissertation.
 Bergson, H.; Matter and Memory (Matière et mémoire, 1896). Swan Sonnenschein 1911, Zone Books 1990: , Dover Publications 2004: .
 Bergson, H.; Laughter: An Essay on the Meaning of the Comic (Le rire, 1900). Green Integer 1998: , Dover Publications 2005: .
 Bergson, H.; Creative Evolution (L'Évolution créatrice, 1907). Henry Holt and Company 1911, University Press of America 1983: , Dover Publications 1998: , Kessinger Publishing 2003: , Cosimo 2005: .
 Bergson, H.; Mind-energy (L'Énergie spirituelle, 1919). McMillan 1920. – a collection of essays and lectures. On Archive.org.
 Bergson, H.; Duration and Simultaneity: Bergson and the Einsteinian Universe (Durée et simultanéité, 1922). Clinamen Press Ltd 1999. .
 Bergson, H.; The Two Sources of Morality and Religion (Les Deux Sources de la Morale et de la Religion, 1932). University of Notre Dame Press 1977. . On Archive.org.
 Bergson, H.; The Creative Mind: An Introduction to Metaphysics (La Pensée et le mouvant, 1934). Citadel Press 1946:  – essay collection, sequel to Mind-Energy, including 1903's "An Introduction to Metaphysics."

See also
 Philosophy of biology
 Psychosophy
 Intuition (Bergson)
 Duration (philosophy)
 List of Jewish Nobel laureates

References

Further reading
 Ansell-Pearson, Keith. Philosophy and the Adventure of the Virtual: Bergson and the Time of Life. London: Routledge, 2002.
Ansell-Pearson, Keith. Bergson. Thinking Beyond the Human Condition. London: Bloomsbury, 2018.
 Bachelard, Gaston. The Dialectic of Duration. Trans. Mary Mcallester Jones. Manchester: Clinamen Press, 2000.
 Bianco, Giuseppe. Après Bergson. Portrait de groupe avec philosophe. Paris, PUF, 2015.
 Canales, Jimena.  The Physicist and the Philosopher: Einstein, Bergson and the Debate That Changed Our Understanding of Time. Princeton, Princeton Press, 2015.
 Deleuze, Gilles. Bergsonism. Trans. Hugh Tomlinson and Barbara Habberjam. New York: Zone Books, 1988.
 Deleuze, Gilles. Cinema 1: The Movement-Image. Trans. Hugh Tomlinson and Barbara Habberjam. Minneapolis: University of Minnesota Press, 1986.
 Deleuze, Gilles. Cinema 2: The Time-Image. Trans. Hugh Tomlinson and Robert Galeta. Minneapolis: University of Minnesota Press, 1989.
 Fradet, Pierre-Alexandre, Derrida-Bergson. Sur l'immédiateté, Hermann, Paris, coll. "Hermann Philosophie", 2014. 
 Grosz, Elizabeth. The Nick of Time: Politics, Evolution, and the Untimely. Durham, NC: Duke University Press, 2004.
 Guerlac, Suzanne. Thinking in Time: An Introduction to Henri Bergson. Ithaca, NY: Cornell University Press, 2006.
 Horkheimer, Max. "On Bergson's Metaphysics of Time." Trans. Peter Thomas, revised by Stewart Martin. Radical Philosophy 131 (2005) 9–19.
 James, William. "Bergson and his Critique of Intellectualism." In A Pluralistic Universe. Lincoln, NE: University of Nebraska Press, 1996. 223–74.
 Lawlor, Leonard. The Challenge of Bergsonism: Phenomenology, Ontology, Ethics. London: Continuum Press, 2003.
Lovasz, Adam. Updating Bergson. A Philosophy of the Enduring Present. Lanham: Lexington Books, 2021.
 Merleau-Ponty, Maurice. "Bergson." In In Praise of Philosophy and Other Essays. Trans. John O'Neill. Evanston, IL: Northwestern University Press, 1963. 9–32.
 Merleau-Ponty, Maurice. "Bergson in the Making." In Signs. Trans. Richard McCleary. Evanston, IL: Northwestern University Press, 1964. 182–91.
 Mullarkey, John. Bergson and Philosophy. Edinburgh University Press, 1999. 
 Mullarkey, John, ed. The New Bergson. Manchester and New York: Manchester University Press, 1999.
 Russell, Bertrand "The Philosophy of Bergson". The Monist 22 (1912): 321–47.
 Sinclair, Mark. Bergson, New York: Routledge, 2020.

External links

 Stanford Encyclopedia of Philosophy entry
 Henri Bergson's theory of laughter. A brief summary.
 « 'A History of Problems' : Bergson and the French Epistemological Tradition », by Elie During
 Gontarski, Stanley E.: Bergson, Henri, in: 1914-1918-online. International Encyclopedia of the First World War.
 M. C. Sanchez Rey « The Bergsonian Philosophy of the Intelligence » translation
 
 Henri Bergson, Nobel Luminaries - Jewish Nobel Prize Winners, on the Beit Hatfutsot-The Museum of the Jewish People Website.
 
List of Works

Works online
 
 
 
 
 Works by Henri Bergson in French at "La Philosophie"
 Complete works in French on the "Classiques des sciences sociales" website
 L'Évolution créatrice (in the original French, 1907)
  of Creative Evolution (HTML)
 multiple formats at Internet Archive
  (HTML)
 multiple formats at Internet Archive
  (HTML)
 multiple formats at Internet Archive

 
1859 births
1941 deaths
19th-century essayists
19th-century French educators
19th-century French Jews
19th-century French male writers
19th-century French philosophers
20th-century essayists
20th-century French educators
20th-century French Jews
20th-century French male writers
20th-century French philosophers
Action theorists
Analytic philosophers
Henri
Academic staff of the Collège de France
Continental philosophers
Corresponding Fellows of the British Academy
Deaths from bronchitis
École Normale Supérieure alumni
Empiricists
Epistemologists
Fellows of the American Academy of Arts and Sciences
French essayists
French ethicists
French male non-fiction writers
French Nobel laureates
French people of Polish-Jewish descent
Grand Croix of the Légion d'honneur
History of psychology
Jewish philosophers
Lycée Condorcet alumni
Lycée Henri-IV teachers
Members of the Académie des sciences morales et politiques
Members of the Académie Française
Metaphilosophers
Metaphysicians
Nobel laureates in Literature
Ontologists
French parapsychologists
Philosophers of art
Philosophers of language
Philosophers of mathematics
Philosophers of mind
Philosophers of psychology
Philosophers of religion
Philosophers of science
Philosophers of time
Prix Blumenthal
Process philosophy
Process theologians
Vitalists
Writers about religion and science
Writers from Paris